Mikhail Aleksandrovich Solovyov (born 7 April 1997) is a Russian football player.

Club career
Solovyov made his debut in the Russian Professional Football League for FC Solyaris Moscow on 11 April 2016 in a game against FC Volga Tver.

On 20 July 2018, Solovyov signed for FC Banants on loan from FC Armavir.

He made his Russian Football National League debut for FC Neftekhimik Nizhnekamsk on 7 July 2019 in a game against FC Mordovia Saransk.

References

External links
 Profile by Russian Professional Football League
 Profile by Russian Football National League
 

1997 births
Sportspeople from Khabarovsk
Living people
Russian footballers
Association football midfielders
FC Solyaris Moscow players
PFC CSKA Moscow players
FC Armavir players
FC Urartu players
FC Neftekhimik Nizhnekamsk players
FC SKA-Khabarovsk players
Russian expatriate footballers
Expatriate footballers in Armenia
Armenian Premier League players
FC Mashuk-KMV Pyatigorsk players